The 2004 Wien Energie Grand Prix was a tennis tournament played on outdoor clay courts. It was part of the Tier III series of the 2004 WTA Tour. It took place in Vienna, Austria, in late May 2004.

Finals

Singles 

 Anna Smashnova-Pistolesi defeated  Alicia Molik 6–2, 3–6, 6–2
 It was Smashnova's 9th career title and her first in 2004

Doubles 

 Martina Navratilova and  Lisa Raymond defeated  Cara Black and  Rennae Stubbs, 6–2, 7–5
 It was Navratilova's 174th career title and her first in 2004; it was Raymond's 43rd career title and her first in 2004.

References

External links
 ITF tournament edition details

2004 WTA Tour
2004
2004 in Austrian women's sport
May 2004 sports events in Europe
WTA